Tullow Museum is a local museum in Tullow, County Carlow in Ireland. It documents the history of Tullow town and the surrounding area.

History
Tullow Museum is located in the former Tullow Methodist church on Bridge Street at the River Slaney Bridge in Tullow. It is run on a voluntary basis by the Tullowphelim Historical Society. The church dates from around 1850.

The museum contains a collection of objects relating to the town's history. There is a focus on Father John Murphy and the events of the 1798 Rebellion, with a display of what are purported to be his last vestments. The museum also has a collection of local historical photographs, and genealogical information on local gravestones. Other items relate to Sir Ernest Shackelton.

References

Museums with year of establishment missing
Local museums in the Republic of Ireland
Museums in County Carlow
History of County Carlow